Barkagaon Rakasiya is a village in Rohtas district, which is a part of Bihar State, India.

Villages in Rohtas district